Air Force Special Operations Command (AFSOC), headquartered at Hurlburt Field, Florida, is the special operations component of the United States Air Force. An Air Force major command (MAJCOM), AFSOC is also the U.S. Air Force component command to United States Special Operations Command (USSOCOM), a unified combatant command located at MacDill Air Force Base, Florida. AFSOC provides all Air Force Special Operations Forces (SOF) for worldwide deployment and assignment to regional unified combatant commands.

Before 1983, Air Force special operations forces were primarily assigned to the Tactical Air Command (TAC) and were generally deployed under the control of U.S. Air Forces in Europe (USAFE) or, as had been the case during the Vietnam War, Pacific Air Forces (PACAF).  Just as it had relinquished control of the C-130 theater airlift fleet to Military Airlift Command (MAC) in 1975, TAC relinquished control of Air Force SOF to MAC in December 1982.

AFSOC was initially established on 10 February 1983 as Twenty-Third Air Force (23 AF), a subordinate numbered air force of MAC, with 23 AF headquarters initially established at Scott Air Force Base, Illinois.  On 1 August 1987, 23 AF headquarters moved to Hurlburt Field, Florida. AFSOC elements include Combat Controllers (CCT), Pararescuemen (PJ), Special Reconnaissance (SR), and Tactical Air Control Party (TACP).

Predecessor USAAF and USAF special operations units

World War II

 1st Air Commando Group: Late 1943 – November 1945
 Operation Carpetbagger: Early 1944 – July 1945

Korean War
 Air Resupply and Communications Service: 23 February 1951 – 12 October 1956
 Combined Command Reconnaissance Activities, Korea: December 1951 – December 1953
 B Flight, 6167th Operations Squadron: 1 April 1952 – 31 December 1953
 6004th Air Intelligence Service Squadron: c. March 1951 – 1955
 6006th Air Intelligence Service Squadron: c. 1953–1955
 22nd Crash Rescue Boat Squadron: c. July 1952 – 1954
 581st Air Supply and Communications Wing: July 1951 – September 1955
 582nd Air Supply and Communications Wing
 580th Air Supply and Communications Wing

Early Cold War era
 129th Air Resupply Group: April 1955 – c. 1975
 130th Air Resupply Group: October 1955 – c. 1960
 135th Air Resupply Group: August 1955 – c. 1971
 143rd Special Operations Group: November 1955 – 1975
 1045th Observation, Evaluation, and Training Group: 23 February 1951 – 1 January 1954

Vietnam War era
 Jungle Jim / 4400th Combat Crew Training Squadron
 Farm Gate
 Operation Waterpump
 Raven Forward Air Controllers
 Project 404
 Palace Dog
 56th Air Commando Wing

Late Cold War era
 4400th Combat Crew Training Group
 1st Special Operations Wing
 Twenty-Third Air Force

Lineage
 Established as Twenty-Third Air Force on 10 February 1983
 Activated on 1 March 1983
 Redesignated Air Force Special Operations Command and made a major command on 22 May 1990

Assignments
 Military Airlift Command, 1 March 1983
 United States Air Force, 22 May 1990 – present

Stations
 Scott AFB, Illinois, 1 March 1983
 Hurlburt Field, Florida, 1 August 1987 – present

Components
 Air Forces Special Operations Center (redesignated 623d Air and Space Operations Center): 13 December 2005 – 1 January 2008
 Twenty-Third Air Force (Air Forces Special Operations Forces): 1 January 2008 – 4 April 2013
 AFSOC Operations Center: 4 April 2013 – present
 2d Air Division, 1 March 1983 – 1 February 1987
 Aerospace Rescue and Recovery Service, 1 March 1983 – 1 August 1989
 Air Rescue Service, 1 August 1989 – 1993
 1st Special Operations Wing, 1 February 1987 – present
 24th Special Operations Wing, 12 June 2012 – present
 27th Special Operations Wing, 1 October 2007 – present
 41st Rescue and Weather Reconnaissance Wing, 1 October 1983 – 1 August 1989
 352d Special Operations Wing, 1 October 1983 – present
 353d Special Operations Group, 6 April 1989 – present
 375th Aeromedical Airlift Wing: 1 January 1984 – 1 February 1990
 492d Special Operations Wing: 10 May 2017 – present
 720th Special Tactics Group: 1 October 1987 – Present
 724th Special Tactics Group: 29 April 2011 – Present
 1550th Aircrew Training and Test Wing (later, 1550th Combat Crew Training Wing): 1 October 1983 – 21 May 1990
 USAF Special Operations School, 1 February 1987 – 22 May 1990
 Air Force Special Operations Training Center, 8 October 2008 – 11 February 2013
 Air Force Special Operations Air Warfare Center, 11 February 2013 – 10 May 2017

Units

Air Force 

The following list contains the flying and Special Tactics squadrons of the Air Force Special Operations Command:

 1st Special Operations Wing, Hurlburt Field, Florida
 1st Special Operations Group
 4th Special Operations Squadron, AC-130J Ghostrider
 8th Special Operations Squadron, CV-22B Osprey
 15th Special Operations Squadron, MC-130H Combat Talon II
 34th Special Operations Squadron, U-28A
 65th Special Operations Squadron, MQ-9 Reaper
 73rd Special Operations Squadron, AC-130J Ghostrider
 319th Special Operations Squadron, U-28A
 24th Special Operations Wing, Hurlburt Field, Florida
 Special Tactics Training Squadron, Hurlburt Field, Florida
 720th Special Tactics Group, Hurlburt Field, Florida
 17th Special Tactics Squadron, Fort Benning, Georgia
 21st Special Tactics Squadron, Pope Field, North Carolina
 22nd Special Tactics Squadron, Joint Base Lewis-McChord, Washington
 23rd Special Tactics Squadron, Hurlburt Field, Florida
 26th Special Tactics Squadron, Cannon AFB, New Mexico
 724th Special Tactics Group, Pope Field, North Carolina
 24th Special Tactics Squadron, Pope Field
 27th Special Operations Wing, Cannon AFB, New Mexico
 27th Special Operations Group
 3rd Special Operations Squadron, MQ-9 Reaper
 9th Special Operations Squadron, MC-130J Commando II
 12th Special Operations Squadron, Expeditionary MQ-9 Reaper launch and recovery
 16th Special Operations Squadron, AC-130W Stinger II
 17th Special Operations Squadron, AC-130J Ghostrider
 20th Special Operations Squadron, CV-22B Osprey
 33rd Special Operations Squadron, MQ-9 Reaper
 310th Special Operations Squadron, U-28A
 318th Special Operations Squadron, U-28A
 352nd Special Operations Wing, RAF Mildenhall, UK (supporting EUCOM, AFRICOM, CENTCOM)
 752nd Special Operations Group
 7th Special Operations Squadron, CV-22B Osprey
 67th Special Operations Squadron, MC-130J Commando II
 321st Special Tactics Squadron
 353rd Special Operations Wing, Kadena Air Base, Japan (supporting INDOPACOM)
 1st Special Operations Squadron, MC-130J Commando II
 21st Special Operations Squadron, at Yokota Air Base (CV-22B Osprey)
 320th Special Tactics Squadron
 492nd Special Operations Wing, Hurlburt Field, Florida
 492nd Special Operations Training Group
 United States Air Force Special Operations School
 6th Special Operations Squadron, U-28A, Duke Field, Florida
 18th Special Operations Test and Evaluation Squadron
 19th Special Operations Squadron, training AC-130U/J, MC-130H, U-28A crews
 371st Special Operations Combat Training Squadron, ground training
 524th Special Operations Squadron, C-146A Wolfhound, Duke Field, Florida
 551st Special Operations Squadron, Cannon AFB, training AC-130W, MQ-9, MC-130J, CV-22B crews

Air National Guard 
 137th Special Operations Wing, Oklahoma Air National Guard, Will Rogers Air National Guard Base, Oklahoma
 137th Special Operations Group
 185th Special Operations Squadron, MC-12W Liberty
 138th Combat Training Flight, ground training
 193d Special Operations Wing, Pennsylvania Air National Guard, Harrisburg Air National Guard Base, Pennsylvania
 193d Special Operations Group
 193d Special Operations Squadron, EC-130J Commando Solo III

Additionally, the Air Force Special Operations Command would gain the following units from Air Mobility Command or Air Combat Command aligned Air National Guard wings:

 427th Special Operations Squadron
 123d Special Tactics Squadron, Kentucky Air National Guard, Louisville Air National Guard Base, Kentucky
 125th Special Tactics Squadron, Oregon Air National Guard, Portland Air National Guard Base, Oregon
 150th Special Operations Squadron, New Jersey Air National Guard, New Jersey
 209th Special Operations Civil Engineer Squadron, Mississippi Air National Guard, Gulfport Combat Readiness Training Center, Mississippi
 280th Special Operations Communications Squadron, Alabama Air National Guard, Dothan Regional Airport, Alabama

Air Force Reserve Command 
The Air Force Reserve Command units of Air Force Special Operations Command are:

 919th Special Operations Wing, Duke Field, Florida
 919th Special Operations Group
 2nd Special Operations Squadron, MQ-9 Reaper, Hurlburt Field, Florida
 5th Special Operations Squadron, U-28A
 711th Special Operations Squadron, C-145A Skytruck
 859th Special Operations Squadron, C-146A Wolfhound

Personnel and resources 

AFSOC has about 20,800 active-duty, Air Force Reserve, Air National Guard and civilian personnel.

The command's SOF units are composed of highly trained, rapidly deployable airmen who are equipped with specialized aircraft. These forces conduct global special operations missions ranging from precision application of firepower, to infiltration, aviation foreign internal defense, exfiltration, resupply and aerial refueling of SOF operational elements.

In addition to the pilots, combat systems officers, and enlisted aircrew who fly AFSOC's aircraft, there is a highly experienced support force of maintenance officers and enlisted aircraft maintenance personnel who maintain these complex aircraft and their support systems, a cadre of premier intelligence officers and enlisted intelligence specialists well versed in special operations, as well as logisticians, security forces and numerous other support officers and personnel.

Another aspect of AFSOC is Special Tactics, the U.S. Air Force's special operations ground force. Similar in ability and employment to Marine Special Operations Command (MARSOC), U.S. Army Special Forces and U.S. Navy SEALs, Air Force Special Tactics personnel are typically the first to enter combat and often find themselves deep behind enemy lines in demanding, austere conditions, usually with little or no support.

The command's Special Tactics Squadrons are led by Special Tactics Officers (STOs). Special Tactics Squadrons combine Combat Controllers, Tactical Air Control Party (TACP), Special Operations Weather Technicians, Pararescuemen (PJs) and Combat Rescue Officers (CROs) to form versatile SOF teams. AFSOC's unique capabilities include airborne radio and television broadcast for psychological operations, as well as combat aviation advisors to provide other governments military expertise for their internal development.

Due to the rigors of the career field, Special Tactics' year-long training is one of the most demanding in the military, with attrition rates between 80 and 90 percent. In an attempt to reduce the high attrition, Special Tactics is very selective when choosing their officers. Special Tactics Officers (STO) undergo a highly competitive process to gain entry into the Special Tactics career field, ensuring only the most promising and capable leaders are selected. STO leadership and role modeling during the difficult training reduces the attrition rate for enlisted trainees.

STO selection is a two-phase process. Beginning with Phase One, a board of veteran STOs reviews application packages consisting of letters of recommendation, fitness test scores, and narratives written by the applicants describing their career aspirations and reasons for applying. Based on Phase One performance, about eight to 10 applicants are invited to the next phase. Phase Two is a weeklong battery of evaluations, ranging from physical fitness and leadership to emotional intelligence and personality indicators. At the end of Phase Two, typically two to four applicants are selected to begin the year-plus Special Tactics training pipeline.

Aircraft

Current 
AFSOC regularly operates the following aircraft:
 AC-130J Ghostrider / AC-130U Spooky II / AC-130W Stinger II
 CV-22B Osprey
 C-32 (Boeing 757)
 EC-130J Commando Solo III
 MC-130H Combat Talon II / MC-130J Commando II
 C-145A Skytruck
 C-146A Wolfhound
 C-208B Caravan
 U-28A Draco
 MQ-9 Reaper
 RQ-11 Raven
 Scan Eagle
 Wasp III

Additionally, AFSOC, through the 492nd Special Operations Wing (as of 2017, and the Air Force Special Operations Air Warfare Center previously), possess and operates a small number of the following aircraft for its special training mission and Aviation Foreign Internal Defense (FID) missions:
 C-130E Hercules
 An-26 Curl
 C-47T Sky Train
 C-212 Aviocar
 CN-235-100
 Mi-17 Hip
 UH-1H and UH-1N Huey

Future 
New AC-130J and MC-130J aircraft based on the Lockheed Martin KC-130J Super Hercules tanker variant are being acquired and sent to certain AFSOC units.  MC-130J aircraft have already entered service while the AC-130J continues developmental testing in preparation for an Initial Operational Capability (IOC) with AFSOC projected for FY 2017

History

Twenty-Third Air Force (23 AF) 
In December 1982, the Air Force transferred responsibility for Air Force special operations from Tactical Air Command (TAC) to Military Airlift Command (MAC). Consequently, in March 1983, MAC activated Twenty-Third Air Force (23 AF) at Scott Air Force Base, Illinois. This new numbered air force's responsibilities included worldwide missions of special operations, combat rescue, weather reconnaissance and aerial sampling, security support for intercontinental ballistic missile sites, training of USAF helicopter and HC-130 crewmen, pararescue training, and medical evacuation.

Operation Urgent Fury
In October 1983, 23 AF helped rescue Americans from the island nation of Grenada. During the seven-day operation, centered at Point Salines Airport, 23 AF furnished MC-130s, AC-130s, aircrews, maintenance, and support personnel. An EC-130 from the 193rd Special Operations Wing of the Air National Guard (ANG) also played a psy-war role. Lieutenant Colonel (later Major General) James L. Hobson Jr., an MC-130 pilot and commander of the 8th Special Operations Squadron, was later awarded the Mackay Trophy for his actions in leading the air drop on the Point Salines Airport.

U.S. Special Operations Command
In May 1986, the Goldwater-Nichols Department of Defense Reorganization Act led to the formation of the United States Special Operations Command. Senators William Cohen and Sam Nunn introduced the Senate bill, and the following month Congressman Dan Daniel introduced a like measure in the House of Representatives. The key provisions of the legislation formed the basis to amend the 1986 Defense Authorizations Bill. This bill, signed into law in October 1986, in part directed the formation of a unified command responsible for special operations. In April 1987, the DoD established the United States Special Operations Command (USSOCOM) at MacDill Air Force Base, Florida, and Army GEN James J. Lindsay assumed command. Four months later, 23 AF moved its headquarters from Scott AFB to Hurlburt Field, Florida.

In August 1989, Gen Duane H. Cassidy, USAF, CINCMAC, divested 23 AF of its non-special operations units, e.g., search and rescue, weather reconnaissance, etc. Thus, 23 AF served a dual role: still reporting to MAC, but also functioning as the air component to USSOCOM.

Operation Just Cause
From late December 1989 to early January 1990, 23 AF participated in the invasion of the Republic of Panama during Operation Just Cause. Special operations aircraft included both active duty AC-130H and Air Force Reserve AC-130A Spectre gunships, EC-130 Volant Solo psychological operations aircraft from the Air National Guard, HC-130P/N Combat Shadow tankers, MC-130E Combat Talons, and MH-53J Pave Low and MH-60G Pave Hawk helicopters. Special tactics Combat Controllers and Pararescuemen provided important support to combat units.

Spectre gunship crews of the 1 SOW earned the Mackay Trophy and Tunner Award for their efforts, with an Air Force Reserve AC-130A Spectre crew from the 919th Special Operations Group (919 SOG) earning the President's Award.  An active duty 1st SOW MC-130 Combat Talon crew ferried the captured Panamanian President, Manuel Noriega, to prison in the United States. Likewise, the efforts of the 1 SOW maintenance people earned them the Daedalian Award.

On 22 May 1990, General Larry D. Welch, USAF, the Chief of Staff of the Air Force, redesignated Twenty-Third Air Force as Air Force Special Operations Command (AFSOC). This new major command consisted of three wings: the 1st, 39th and 353rd Special Operations Wings as well as the 1720th Special Tactics Group (1720 STG), the U.S. Air Force Special Operations School, and the Special Missions Operational Test and Evaluation Center.

Currently, after major redesignations and reorganizations, AFSOC direct reporting units include the 16th Special Operations Wing, the 352nd Special Operations Group, the 353rd Special Operations Group, the 720th Special Tactics Group (720 STG), the USAF Special Operations School and the 18th Flight Test Squadron (18 FLTS). During the early 1990s a major reorganization occurred within AFSOC. The 1720 STG became the 720 STG in March 1992; the transfer of ownership of Hurlburt Field from Air Mobility Command (AMC, and formerly MAC) to AFSOC in October 1992, followed by the merger of the 834th Air Base Wing (834 ABW) into the 1 SOW, which assumed host unit responsibilities. A year later the 1 SOW became the 16 SOW in a move to preserve Air Force heritage.

Meanwhile, the Special Missions Operational Test and Evaluation Center (SMOTEC), which explored heavy lift frontiers in special operations capabilities, while pursuing better equipment and tactics development, was also reorganized. In April 1994, the Air Force, in an effort to standardize these types of organizations, redesignated SMOTEC as the 18th Flight Test Squadron (18 FLTS).

Gulf War
From early August 1990 to late February 1991, AFSOC participated in Operation Desert Shield and Operation Desert Storm, the protection of Saudi Arabia and liberation of Kuwait. Special tactics personnel operated throughout the theater on multiple combat control and combat rescue missions.
Special operations forces performed direct action missions, combat search and rescue, infiltration, exfiltration, air base ground defense, air interdiction, special reconnaissance, close air support, psychological operations, and helicopter air refuelings. Pave Low crews led the helicopter assault on radars to blind Iraq at the onset of hostilities, and they also accomplished the deepest rescue for which they received the Mackay Trophy.

MC-130E/H Combat Talons dropped the BLU-82, the largest conventional bombs of the war and, along with MC-130P Combat Shadows, dropped the most psychological warfare leaflets, while AC-130A and AC-130H Spectre gunships provided valuable fire support and armed reconnaissance.  However, the AC-130 community also suffered the single greatest combat loss of coalition air forces with the shoot down of an AC-130H, call sign Spirit 03, by an Iraqi SA-7 Grail surface-to-air missile. All fourteen crew members aboard Spirit 03 were killed.

AFSOC

Post-Gulf War
In December 1992, AFSOC special tactics and intelligence personnel supported Operation Restore Hope in Somalia. In late 1994, AFSOC units spearheaded Operation Uphold Democracy in Haiti, and in 1995 Operation Deliberate Force in the Balkans.

Operation Enduring Freedom

The terrorist attacks on the World Trade Center in New York City, and the Pentagon, Washington D.C., on 11 September 2001 pushed the United States special operations forces to the forefront of the war against terrorism. By the end of September 2001, AFSOC deployed forces to southwest Asia for Operation Enduring Freedom – Afghanistan to help destroy the al Qaeda terrorist organization and remove the Taliban regime in Afghanistan. AFSOC airpower delivered special tactics forces to the battle ground and they in turn focused U.S. airpower and allowed Afghanistan's Northern Alliance ground forces to dispatch the Taliban and al Qaeda from Afghanistan. AFSOC personnel also deployed to the Philippines to help aid that country's efforts against terrorism.

US Air Force Special Operations had a long-term presence in the Philippines during Operation Enduring Freedom – Philippines.

Operation Iraqi Freedom 
In March 2003, AFSOC again deployed forces to southwest Asia this time in support of what would become Operation Iraqi Freedom – the removal of Saddam Hussein and his Baathist government. The command's personnel and aircraft teamed with SOF and conventional forces to quickly bring down Saddam Hussein's government by May 2003. AFSOC forces continued to conduct operations in support of the new Iraqi government against insurgents and terrorists.

Interoperability and Multinational trainings 
The USAFSOC takes part in the multinational trainings at the King Abdullah II Special Operations Training Centre in which it trains in multiple scenarios with partner nations in order to increase interoperability between partner forces.

Commanders
AFSOC has had eleven commanders since its inception in 1990.

Contingency operations

Gallery

See also
 Ground Mobility Vehicle – (US)SOCOM program
 V-22 Osprey
 Air Resupply And Communications Service
Special Services Wing

References

Further reading
 Chinnery, Philip D. Any Time, Any Place: Fifty Years of the USAF Air Commando and Special Operations Forces, 1944–1994. Annapolis, Md: Naval Institute Press, 1994. 
 Haas, Michael E. Apollo's Warriors: U.S. Air Force Special Operations During the Cold War. 2002, University Press of the Pacific, Honolulu. .
 Hebert, Adam J. "The Air Commandos". Air Force Magazine, March 2005 (vol. 88, no. 3).
 Marquis, Susan L. Unconventional Warfare: Rebuilding U.S. Special Operations Forces. Washington, D.C.: Brookings Institution, 1997. 
 Pushies, Fred J. Deadly Blue Battle Stories of the U.S. Air Force Special Operations Command. New York: American Management Assoc, 2009. Books24x7. 
 Sine, William F. Guardian Angel: Life and Death Adventures with Pararescue, the World's Most Powerful Commando Rescue Force. Havertown, Pa: Casemate, 2012.

External links

 Air Force Special Operations Command home page—Official AFSOC public site
 AFSOC Factsheet public site
 United States Air Force official website
 ShadowSpear Special Operations: AFSOC

Special Operations Command
Special operations commands of the United States Armed Forces
 
Military units and formations in Florida
Military units and formations established in 1983
Air force special forces units